A by-election for the seat of Cessnock in the New South Wales Legislative Assembly was held on 21 February 1981. The by-election was triggered by the resignation of Bob Brown to successfully contest the federal House of Representatives seat of Hunter at the 1980 election.

By-elections for the seats of Maitland, Oxley and Sturt were held on the same day.

Dates

Results

Bob Brown resigned to successfully contest the federal House of Representatives seat of Hunter.

See also
Electoral results for the district of Cessnock
List of New South Wales state by-elections

References

1981 elections in Australia
New South Wales state by-elections
1980s in New South Wales